Cyanovirin-N (CV-N) is a protein produced by the cyanobacterium Nostoc ellipsosporum that displays virucidal activity against several viruses, including human immunodeficiency virus (HIV). The virucidal activity of CV-N is mediated through specific high-affinity interactions with the viral surface envelope glycoproteins gp120 and gp41, as well as to high-mannose oligosaccharides found on the HIV envelope. In addition, CV-N is active against rhinoviruses, human parainfluenza virus, respiratory syncytial virus, and enteric viruses. The virucidal activity of CV-N against influenza virus is directed towards viral haemagglutinin. CV-N has a complex fold composed of a duplication of a tandem repeat of two homologous motifs comprising three-stranded beta-sheet and beta-hairpins.

Professor Julian Ma of St George's Hospital, South London, has a project in Kent, England to use genetically modified tobacco plants to produce the Cyanovirin and from this produce a cream which could be used to prevent HIV infection
Cyanovirin is a protein with a highly complicated structure, it binds to sugars attached to HIV, it envelopes the protein and prevents it from binding to the mucosal cell surfaces in the Vagina and Rectum, this  compound is also active against herpes viruses.

"Development of cyanovirin has been exceedingly slow-paced. The chief of the NCI cyanovirin program, Michael Boyd, described it as "languishing." Apparently the NCI's production facilities, based on genetically manipulated cell cultures, have been diverted to other projects that the agency considers of higher priority. This is unfortunate: cyanovirin is of particular interest because of its relative safety. It is 10,000 times more toxic to HIV than it is to cells."

This protein may use the morpheein model of allosteric regulation.

References

External links 
 BBC News Article on using Tobacco Plants to produce Cyanovirin
 Freedom Antiviral for Freedom from STDs

Antiretroviral drugs
Proteins
Proteomics